craft&design was a magazine about crafts in the UK. The magazine was originally published as Craftsman Magazine from its launch in 1983 up until July 2007. With the March–April 2017 issue, its print edition folded and it became an only-online magazine. In December 2018, the online magazine and the "craft&design" website closed due to the retirement of its owners.

History and profile
The magazine launched as Craftsman Magazine in 1983. In 2007, Angie and Paul Boyer, Directors of PSB Design and Print Consultants Limited, relaunched the title as craft&design. Although the magazine was given a new format, a redesign and a change of title, the aim of the publication remained the same: to help craftspeople in Britain to earn a living from their work.

The substantial changes that were made to the design and content of the magazine reflected the contemporary path that British crafts had taken in the early years of the 21st century. Previously focusing on providing information for craft people wanting to sell their work primarily at UK craft and trade fairs, the relaunched magazine now also encompasses craft galleries and exhibitions, commissioned work, and residencies for artists and makers, as well as information about UK craft and trade fairs. The main editorial and features are about artists, designers, and makers of contemporary craftwork; with information provided through interviews with makers and business tips and advice coming from people who work within the British craft industry.

Published bi-monthly, 6 times a year, craft&design is a privately owned UK magazine which covers all aspects of British crafts and the various craft disciplines. The magazine became an online magazine following the publication of the last print issue, March–April 2017.

References

External links
Official site

2007 establishments in the United Kingdom
2017 disestablishments in the United Kingdom
Arts and crafts magazines
Visual arts magazines published in the United Kingdom
Bi-monthly magazines published in the United Kingdom
Online magazines published in the United Kingdom
Defunct magazines published in the United Kingdom
Magazines established in 2007
Magazines disestablished in 2017
Online magazines with defunct print editions